In 2017, the foremost athletics event was the World Championships in London. The other major global-level competition in 2017 was the World Cross Country Championships.

Major championships

World

World Championships
World U18 Championships
World Cross Country Championships
World Relays
World Mountain Running Championships
World Long Distance Mountain Running Championships
World Masters Indoor Championships
World Para Championships
IAU 50 km World Championships
IAU 24 Hour World Championships
IAU Trail World Championships
Universiade
World Police and Fire Games
Commonwealth Youth Games

Regional

African U20 Championships
Arab Championships
Asian Championships
Asian Marathon Championships
Asian Race Walking Championships
Asian Youth Championships
Jeux de la Francophonie
Southeast Asian Games
ASEAN Para Games
Asian Indoor and Martial Arts Games
Islamic Solidarity Games
Maccabiah Games
Island Games
Pacific Mini Games
Asian Youth Games (postponed)
East Asian Games (postponed)
European Athletics U23 Championships
European Athletics U20 Championships
European Cross Country Championships
European Cup Combined Events
European Throwing Cup
European Cup 10,000m
European Indoor Championships
European Mountain Running Championships
European Race Walking Cup
European Team Championships
Balkan Championships
Games of the Small States of Europe
European Youth Olympic Festival
Mediterranean Games (postponed)
Bolivarian Games
Central American and Caribbean Age Group Championships
Central American and Caribbean Championships
Central American and Caribbean Junior Championships
CARIFTA Games
NACAC Age Group Championships
NACAC Combined Events Championships
NACAC Cross Country Championships
NACAC Race Walking Championships
NACAC U20 Championships
Pan American U20 Championships
Pan American Race Walking Cup
South American Championships
South American Cross Country Championships
South American Half Marathon Championships
South American U20 Championships
South American Marathon Championships
South American Mountain Running Championships
South American Road Mile Championships
South American Trail Championships

Seasonal events

Diamond League
IAAF Hammer Throw Challenge
IAAF Combined Events Challenge
IAAF Race Walking Challenge
World Marathon Majors
 Tokyo
 Boston
 London
 Berlin
 Chicago
 New York City
 World Championships men's marathon/World Championships women's marathon
IAAF Label Road Races

World records

Indoor

Outdoor

Awards

Men

Women

Season's bests

Detailed results

International Association of Athletics Federations (IAAF)

2017 World athletics championships
 March 26: 2017 IAAF World Cross Country Championships in  Kampala
 Senior individual winners:  Geoffrey Kipsang Kamworor (m) /  Irene Chepet Cheptai (f)
 Senior team winners:  (m) /  (f)
 U20 individual winners:  Jacob Kiplimo (m) /  Letesenbet Gidey (f)
 U20 team winners:  (m) /  (f)
 Mixed Relay winners:  (Asbel Kiprop, Winfred Nzisa Mbithe, Bernard Kipkorir Koros, & Beatrice Chepkoech)
 April 22 & 23: 2017 IAAF World Relays in  Nassau
 4 × 100 m relay winners:  (m) /  (f)
 4 × 200 m relay winners:  (m) /  (f)
 4 × 400 m relay winners:  (m) /  (f)
 4 × 800 m relay winners:  (m) /  (f)
 Mixed 4 × 400 m relay winners: 
 July 12 – 16: 2017 World U18 Championships in Athletics in  Nairobi
 July 14 – 23: 2017 World Para Athletics Championships in  London
  won both the gold and overall medal tallies.
 August 4 – 13: 2017 World Championships in Athletics in  London
 The  won both the gold and overall medal tallies.

2017 World Marathon Majors
 February 26: 2017 Tokyo Marathon
 Winners:  Wilson Kipsang (m) /  Sarah Chepchirchir (f)
 April 17: 2017 Boston Marathon
 Winners:  Geoffrey Kirui (m) /  Edna Kiplagat (f)
 April 23: 2017 London Marathon
 Winners:  Daniel Wanjiru (m) /  Mary Keitany (f)
 August 6: Part of the 2017 World Championships in Athletics (Men / Women) in  London
 Winners:  Geoffrey Kirui (m) /  Rose Chelimo (f)
 September 24: 2017 Berlin Marathon
 Winners:  Eliud Kipchoge (m) /  Gladys Cherono Kiprono (f)
 October 8: 2017 Chicago Marathon
 Winners:  Galen Rupp (m) /  Tirunesh Dibaba (f)
 November 5: 2017 New York City Marathon
 Winners:  Geoffrey Kipsang Kamworor (m) /  Shalane Flanagan (f)

2017 IAAF Road Race Label Events (Gold)
 January 2:  Xiamen International Marathon
 Winners:  Lemi Berhanu Hayle (m) /  Meseret Mengistu (f)
 January 20:  Dubai Marathon
 Winners:  Tamirat Tola (m) /  Worknesh Degefa (f)
 February 12:  Hong Kong Marathon
 Winners:  Melaku Belachew (m)  Gulume Tollesa (f)
 February 26:  World's Best 10K
 Winners:  Sam Chelanga (m) /  Mary Wacera Ngugi (f)
 March 5:  Lake Biwa Marathon (men only)
 Winner:  Ezekiel Kiptoo Chebii
 March 12:  Nagoya Women's Marathon (women only)
 Winner:  Eunice Kirwa
 March 12:  Roma-Ostia Half Marathon
 Winners:  Guye Adola (m) /  Gladys Cherono Kiprono (f)
 March 19:  Lisbon Half Marathon
 Winners:  Jake Robertson (m) /  Mare Dibaba (f)
 March 19:  Seoul International Marathon
 Winners:  Amos Kipruto (m) /  Margaret Agai (f)
 April 1:  Prague Half Marathon
 Winners:  Tamirat Tola (m) /  Joyciline Jepkosgei (f)
 April 9:  Paris Marathon
 Winners:  Paul Lonyangata (m) /  Purity Rionoripo (f)
 April 9:  Rotterdam Marathon
 Winners:  Marius Kimutai (m) /  Meskerem Assefa (f)
 April 23:  Gifu Seiryu Half Marathon
 Winners:  Alexander Mutiso (m) /  Joyciline Jepkosgei (f)
 April 23:  Vienna City Marathon
 Winners:  Albert Korir (m) /  Nancy Kiprop (f)
 April 23:  Yangzhou Jianzhen International Half Marathon
 Winners:  Mosinet Geremew (m) /  Sutume Asefa (f)
 April 23:  Madrid Marathon
 Winners:  Bonsa Dida (m) /  Elizabeth Rumokol (f)
 April 30:  Istanbul Half Marathon
 Winners:  Ismail Juma (m) /  Ruth Chepngetich (f)
 May 7:  Prague Marathon
 Winners:  Gebretsadik Abraha (m) /  Valary Aiyabei (f)
 May 7:  Yellow River Estuary International Marathon
 Winners:  Husen Muhammedahin Esmael (m) /  Letebrhan Haylay Gebreslase (f)
 May 20:  Mattoni Karlovy Vary Half Marathon
 Winners:  Wilfred Kimitei (m) /  Yvonne Jelagat (f)
 May 27 & 28:  Ottawa Race Weekend
 10 km winners:  Leul Gebresilase (m) /  Netsanet Gudeta (f)
 Marathon winners:  Eliud Kiptanui (m) /  Guteni Imana (f)
 June 3:  České Budějovice Half Marathon
 Winners:  Justus Kangogo (m) /  Agnes Jeruto Barsosio (f)
 June 24:  Olomouc Half Marathon
 Winners:  Josphat Kiprop Kiptis (m) /  Worknesh Degefa (f)
 July 2:  Gold Coast Marathon
 Winners:  Takuya Noguchi (m) /  Abebe Afework (f)
 July 30:  Bogotá Half Marathon
 Winners:  Feyisa Lilesa (m) /  Brigid Jepchirchir Kosgei (f)
 September 9:  Prague Grand Prix
 Winners:  Benard Kimeli (m) /  Joyciline Jepkosgei (f) (World Record)
 September 16:  Ústí nad Labem Half Marathon
 Winners:  Barselius Kipyego (m) /  Violah Jepchumba (f)
 September 17:  Sydney Marathon
 Winners:  Shota Hattori (m) /  Makda Harun (f)
 September 17:  Copenhagen Half Marathon
 Winners:  Abraham Cheroben (m) /  Eunice Chumba (f)
 September 17:  Beijing Marathon
 Winners:  Salah-Eddine Bounasr (m) /  Meselech Beyene (f)
 September 17:  Cape Town Marathon
 Winners:  Asefa Mengstu (m) /  Betelhem Moges (f)
 October 15:  Amsterdam Marathon
 Winners:  Lawrence Cherono (m) /  Tadelech Bekele (f)
 October 15:  Rock 'n' Roll Lisbon Half Marathon Santander Totta RTP
 Winners:  Birhan Nebebew (m) /  Eunice Chumba (f)
 October 15:  Rock 'n' Roll Lisbon Marathon EDP
 Winners:  Ishhimael Bushendich Chemtan (m) /  Sarah Chepchirchir (f)
 October 22:  Toronto Waterfront Marathon
 Winners:  Philemon Rono (m) /  Marta Megra Lema (f)
 October 22:  Valencia Half Marathon
 Winners:  Abraham Cheroben (m) /  Joyciline Jepkosgei (f)
 October 29:  Frankfurt Marathon
 Winners:  Shura Kitata Tola (m) /  Vivian Cheruiyot (f)
 November 12:  Shanghai Marathon
 Winners:  Stephen Mokoka (m) /  Roza Dereje (f)
 November 12:  Istanbul Marathon
 Winners:  Abraham Kiprotich (m) /  Ruth Chepngetich (f)
 November 19:  Maratón Valencia Trinidad Alfonso EDP
 Winners:  Sammy Kitwara (m) /  Aberu Mekuria (f)
 November 19:  Delhi Half Marathon
 Winners:  Birhanu Legese (m) /  Almaz Ayana (f)
 December 3:  Fukuoka Marathon (men only)
 Winner:  Sondre Nordstad Moen
 December 3:  Singapore Marathon (final)
 Winners:  Cosmas Koech Kimutai (m) /  Pamela Rotich (f)

2017 IAAF Road Race Label Events (Silver)
 January 15:  Houston Marathon
 Winners:  Dominic Ondoro (m) /  Meskerem Assefa (f)
 January 29:  Osaka International Ladies Marathon (women only)
 Winner:  Risa Shigetomo
 February 5:  Kagawa Marugame Half Marathon
 Winners:  Callum Hawkins (m) /  Eunice Kirwa (f)
 February 12:  Mitja Marató de Barcelona
 Winners:  Leonard Langat (m) /  Florence Kiplagat (f)
 February 19:  Seville Marathon
 Winners:  Titus Ekiru (m) /  Paula González Berodia (f)
 March 19:  Chongqing International Marathon
 Winners:  Afewerk Mesfin (m) /  Nguriatukei Rael Kiyara (f)
 April 2:  Daegu Marathon
 Winners:  Mathew Kisorio (m) /  Pamela Jepkosgei Rotich (f)
 April 2:  Rome Marathon
 Winners:  Shura Kitata (m) /  Rahma Tusa (f)
 April 9:  Hannover Marathon
 Winners:  Allan Kiprono (m) /  Fate Tola (f)
 April 23:  DOZ Marathon Lodz with PZU
 Winners:  Samson Barmao (m) /  Kenza Dahmani (f)
 April 23:  Orlen Warsaw Marathon
 Winners:  Felix Kimutai (m) /  Nastassia Ivanova (f)
 June 11:  Lanzhou International Marathon
 Winners:  Kelkile Gezahegn (m) /  Ashete Bekere (f)
 September 17:  Dam tot Damloop
 Winners:  Birhanu Legese (m) /  Mercyline Chelangat (f)
 October 1:  Cardiff Half Marathon
 Winners:  John Lotiang (m) /  Edith Chelimo (f)
 October 29:  Marseille-Cassis Classique Internationale
 Winners:  Jemal Yimer (m) /  Edith Chelimo (f)
 November 12:  Saitama International Marathon (women only)
 Winner:  Flomena Cheyech Daniel
 November 12:  Beirut Marathon
 Winners:  Dominic Ruto (m) /  Eunice Chumba (f)
 December 10:  Guangzhou Marathon
 Winners:  Dickson Kipsang Tuwei (m) /  Rahma Tusa (f)
 December 31:  Corrida de Houilles (co-final)
 Winners:  Julien Wanders (m) /  Stacey Ndiwa (f)
 December 31:  San Silvestre Vallecana (co-final)
 Winners:  Erick Kiptanui (m) /  Gelete Burka (f)

2017 IAAF Road Race Label Events (Bronze)
 January 15:  Houston Half Marathon
 Winners:  Leonard Essau Korir (m) /  Veronica Nyaruai (f)
 January 22:  Mitja Marató Internacional Vila de Santa Pola
 Winners:  Peter Cheruiyot Kirui (m) /  Antonina Kwambai (f)
 March 12:  Barcelona Marathon
 Winners:  Jonah Kipkemoi Chesum (m) /  Helen Bekele (f)
 March 19:  New Taipei City Wan Jin Shi Marathon
 Winners:  Hillary Yego (m) /  Munkhzaya Bayartsogt (f)
 March 19:  ONICO Gdynia Half Marathon
 Winners:  Hillary Maiyo (m) /  Fatiha Benchatki (f)
 March 26:  Warsaw Half Marathon
 Winners:  John Lotiang (m) /  Ayantu Gemechu (f)
 April 2:  Milano City Marathon
 Winners:  Edwin Kipngetich Koech (m) /  Sheila Chepkoech (f)
 April 2:  Santiago Marathon
 Winners:  Luka Rotich Lobuwan (m) /  Inés Melchor (f)
 April 9:  Pyongyang Marathon
 Winners:  Pak Chol (m) /  JO Un Ok (f)
 April 16:  Nagano Olympic Commemorative Marathon
 Winners:  Taiga Ito (m) /  Rachel Jemutai Mutgaa (f)
 May 7:  Geneva Marathon
 Winners:  William Yegon (m) /  Motu Megersa (f)
 May 13:  Okpekpe Intn'l 10 km Road Race
 Winners:  Leul Gebresilase (m) /  Azemra Gebru (f)
 May 14:  Riga Marathon
 Winners:  Joseph Kyengo Munywoki (m) /  Bekelech Daba (f)
 May 21:  Tata Consultancy Services World 10K Bengaluru
 Winners:  Alex Korio (m) /  Irene Chepet Cheptai (f)
 May 28:  Edinburgh Marathon
 Winners:  Julius Kiplagat Korir (m) /  Eddah Jepkosgei (f)
 June 17:  Corrida de Langueux
 Winners:  Dawit Fikadu (m) /  Birhane Mihretu (f)
 June 24:  Vidovdan Road Race
 Winners:  Lencho Tesfaye Anbesa (m) /  Belaynesh Tsegaye Beyene (f)
 August 27:  Mexico City Marathon
 Winners:  Fikadu Kebede Debele (m) /  Gladys Tejeda (f)
 September 10:  Minsk Half Marathon
 Winners:  Hillary Kiptum Maiyo (m) /  Lyudmyla Liakhovich (f)
 September 10:  Taiyuan International Marathon
 Winners:  Azmeraw Bekele (m) /  Chemtai Rionotukei (f)
 September 24:  Warsaw Marathon
 Winners:  Blazej Brzezinski (m) /  Bekelu Beji (f)
 September 30:  Hengshui Lake International Marathon
 Winners:  Michael Njenga Kunyuga (m) /  Betty Wilson Lempus (f)
 October 1:  Košice Peace Marathon
 Winners:  Reuben Kerio (m) /  Sheila Jerotich (f)
 October 8:  Bournemouth Marathon
 Winners:  Jacek Cieluszecki (m) /  Laura Trimble (f)
 October 8:  20 Kilomètres de Paris
 Winners:  Collins Chebii (m) /  Gebayanesh Ayele (f)
 October 22:  Venice Marathon
 Winners:  Eyob Gebrehiwet (m) /  Gedo Sule Utura (f)
 October 29:  Ljubljana Marathon
 Winners:  Marius Kimutai (m) /  Shuko Genemo Wote (f)
 November 5:  French Riviera Marathon
 Winners:  Dejene Kelkilew (m) /  Tejitu Siyum (f)
 November 5:  Hangzhou Marathon
 Winners:  Azmeraw Bekele (m) /  Muluhabt Tsega (f)
 November 19:  Boulogne-Billancourt Half Marathon
 Winners:  Hiskel Tewelde (m) /  Rahma Tusa (f)
 November 26:  Florence Marathon
 Winners:  Zelalem Bacha (m) /  Dire Tune (f)
 December 3:  Marathon du Gabon
 Winners:  Peter Kurui (m) /  Joan Kigen (f)
 December 17:  Shenzhen Marathon (final)
 Winners:  Peter Kimeli Some (m) /  Viktoriia Poliudina (f)

2017 IAAF Diamond League
 May 5: Doha Diamond League in  Doha
 The  and  won 3 gold medals each. The United States won the overall medal tally.
 May 13: IAAF Diamond League Shanghai in  Shanghai
 The  and  won 3 gold medals each. The United States won the overall medal tally.
 May 27: Prefontaine Classic in  Eugene, Oregon
 The  won both the gold and overall medal tallies.
 June 8: Golden Gala Pietro Mennea in  Rome
The United States won the overall medal tally.
 June 15: Bislett Games in  Oslo
 13 nations won a gold medal each.
 June 18: Stockholm Bauhaus Athletics in  Stockholm
 13 nations won a gold medal each.  won the overall medal tally.
 July 1: Meeting de Paris in  Saint-Denis
  won the gold medal tally.  won the overall medal tally.
 July 6: Athletissima in  Lausanne
 The  won both the gold and overall medal tallies.
 July 9: London Grand Prix in  London
 The  won both the gold and overall medal tallies.
 July 16: Meeting International Mohammed VI d'Athlétisme de Rabat in  Rabat
  won the gold medal tally. Morocco and the  won 8 overall medals each.
 July 21: Herculis in  Monaco
 The  won both the gold and overall medal tallies.
 August 20: British Grand Prix in  Birmingham
  won both the gold and overall medal tallies. 
 August 24: Weltklasse Zürich in  Zürich
 The  won the gold medal tally. The  won the overall medal tally.
 September 1: Memorial Van Damme (final) in  Brussels
 The  and  won 4 gold medals each. The United States won the overall medal tally.

2017 IAAF World Challenge & IAAF Hammer Throw Challenge
 May 20: Jamaica International Invitational in  Kingston (World Challenge only)
 World Challenge:  won the gold medal tally. The  won the overall medal tally.
 May 21: Golden Grand Prix in  Kawasaki, Kanagawa
 World Challenge: The  won the gold medal tally. The United States and  won 14 overall medals each.
 Women's Hammer Throw winner:  Gwen Berry
 June 3: Grande Premio Brasil de Atletismo in  São Bernardo do Campo
 World Challenge:  won both the gold and overall medal tallies.
 Women's Hammer Throw winner:  Anita Włodarczyk
 June 10: Janusz Kusociński Memorial in  Szczecin (Hammer Throw Challenge only)
 Hammer Throw winners:  Paweł Fajdek (m) /  Anita Włodarczyk (f)
 June 11: Fanny Blankers-Koen Games in  Hengelo (World Challenge only)
 World Challenge:  won both the gold and overall medal tallies.
 June 13: Paavo Nurmi Games in  Turku
 World Challenge:  and  won 3 gold and 8 overall medals each.
 Men's Hammer Throw winner:  Paweł Fajdek
 June 17: P-T-S Meeting in  Šamorín (Hammer Throw Challenge only)
 Hammer Throw winners:  Paweł Fajdek (m) /  Anita Włodarczyk (f)
 June 27 & 28: Golden Spike Ostrava in  Ostrava
 World Challenge:  won both the gold and overall medal tallies.
 Hammer Throw winners:  Paweł Fajdek (m) /  Anita Włodarczyk (f)
 July 3 & 4: István Gyulai Memorial in  Székesfehérvár (Hammer Throw Challenge only)
 Hammer Throw winners:  Paweł Fajdek (m) /  Anita Włodarczyk (f)
 July 14: Meeting de Atletismo Madrid in  Madrid
 World Challenge:  won the gold medal tally. The  won the overall medal tally.
 Men's Hammer Throw winner:  Paweł Fajdek
 August 4 – 13: Part of the 2017 World Championships in Athletics in  London (Hammer Throw Challenge only)
 Winners:  Paweł Fajdek (m) /  Anita Włodarczyk (f)
 August 27: ISTAF Berlin in  Berlin (World Challenge only)
 World Challenge: The  and  won 4 gold medals each. The United States won the overall medal tally.
 August 29: Hanžeković Memorial (final) in  Zagreb (World Challenge only)
 World Challenge: The  won both the gold and overall medal tallies.

2017 IAAF World Indoor Tour
 January 28: New Balance Indoor Grand Prix in  Roxbury
 60 m winners:  Harry Aikines-Aryeetey (m) /  English Gardner (f)
 300 m winners:  Noah Lyles (m) /  Courtney Okolo (f)
 Men's 600m winner:  Duane Solomon 
 Women's 800m winner:  Charlene Lipsey
 3000 m winners:  Paul Chelimo (m) /  Hellen Obiri (f)
 Men's High Jump winner:  Donald Thomas
 Men's Long Jump winner:  Fabrice Lapierre
 Men's One Mile winner:  Matthew Centrowitz Jr.
 Women's Pole Vault winner:  Ekaterini Stefanidi
 Women's Triple Jump winner:  Patrícia Mamona
 Women's Distance Medley Relay winners: The 
 February 1: PSD Bank Meeting in  Düsseldorf
 60 m winners:  Yunier Perez (m) /  Olesya Povh (f)
 60 m Hurdles winners:  Orlando Ortega (m) /  Cindy Roleder (f)
 800 m winners:  Adam Kszczot (m) /  Joanna Jóźwik (f)
 Men's 1500 m winner:  Elijah Manangoi
 Men's 3000 m winner:  Hillary Cheruiyot Ngetich
 Women's Pole Vault winner:  Sandi Morris
 Women's Triple Jump winner:  Patrícia Mamona
 Women's Shot Put winner:  Anita Márton
 February 4: Weltklasse in Karlsruhe in  Karlsruhe
 800 m winners:  Erik Sowinski (m) /  Joanna Jóźwik (f)
 60 m Hurdles winners:  Andrew Pozzi (m) /  Kendra Harrison (f)
 Men's 1500 m winner:  Silas Kiplagat
 Men's High Jump winner:  Pavel Seliverstau
 Men's Long Jump winner:  Godfrey Khotso Mokoena
 Women's 60 m winner:  Gayon Evans
 Women's 3000 m winner:  Laura Muir
 Women's Pole Vault winner:  Lisa Ryzih
 Women's Shot Put winner:  Christina Schwanitz
 February 10: Copernicus Cup in  Toruń
 60 m winners:  Ronnie Baker (m) /  Barbara Pierre (f)
 800 m winners:  Nicholas Kiplangat Kipkoech (m) /  Joanna Józwik (f)
 1500 m winners:  Bethwell Birgen (m) /  Genzebe Dibaba (f)
 60 m Hurdles winners:  Orlando Ortega (m) /  Andrea Ivančević (f)
 Men's High Jump winner:  Sylwester Bednarek
 Women's Pole Vault winner:  Nicole Büchler
 Women's Triple Jump winner:  Anna Jagaciak-Michalska
 February 18: Birmingham Indoor Grand Prix (final) in  Birmingham
 60 m winners:  Ronnie Baker (m) /  Elaine Thompson (f)
 400 m winners:  Pavel Maslák (m) /  Zuzana Hejnová (f)
 800 m winners:  Casimir Loxsom (m) /  Joanna Józwik (f)
 60 m Hurdles winners:  Andrew Pozzi (m) /  Christina Manning (f)
 Long Jump winners:  Godfrey Khotso Mokoena (m) /  Lorraine Ugen (f)
 Men's 1500 m winner:  Ben Blankenship
 Men's 5000 m winner:  Mo Farah
 Men's High Jump winner:  Erik Kynard
 Women's 1000 m winner:  Laura Muir
 Women's 3000 m winner:  Hellen Obiri
 Women's Pole Vault winner:  Ekaterini Stefanidi
 Women's Shot Put winner:  Anita Márton

2017 IAAF Combined Events Challenge
 April 28 & 29: Multistars in  Florence
 Decathlon winner:  Jefferson Santos (7,728 points)
 Heptathlon winner:  Evelis Aguilar (6,228 points)
 May 27 & 28: Hypo-Meeting in  Götzis
 Decathlon winner:  Damian Warner (8,591 points)
 Heptathlon winner:  Nafissatou Thiam (7,013 points)
 June 17 & 18: TNT – Fortuna Meeting in  Kladno
 Decathlon winner:  Larbi Bourrada (8,120 points)
 Heptathlon winner:  Kateřina Cachová (6,337 points)
 June 24 & 25: Mehrkampf-Meeting Ratingen in  Ratingen
 Decathlon winner:  Rico Freimuth (8,663 points)
 Heptathlon winner:  Carolin Schäfer (6,667 points)
 July 1 & 2: European Cup Combined Events - Super League in  Tallinn
 Decathlon winner:  Janek Õiglane (8,170 points)
 Heptathlon winner:  Alina Shukh (6,208 points)
 July 1 & 2: European Cup Combined Events - First & Second League in  Monzón
 First League Decathlon winner:  Jorge Ureña (8,121 points)
 First League Heptathlon winner:  Nadine Broersen (6,326 points)
 Second League Decathlon winner:  Martin Roe (8,144 points)
 Second League Heptathlon winner:  Lucia Slaničková (5,816 points)
 July 4 & 5: Pan American Combined Events Cup in  Ottawa
 Decathlon winner:  Pierce Lepage (7,948 points)
 Heptathlon winner:  Nicole Oudenaarden (6,000 points)
 August 4 – 13: Part of the 2017 World Championships in Athletics in  London
 Decathlon winner:  Kévin Mayer (8,768 points)
 Heptathlon winner:  Nafissatou Thiam (6,784 points)
 September 16 & 17: Décastar (final) in  Talence
 Decathlon winner:  Damian Warner (8,252 points)
 Heptathlon winner:  Anouk Vetter (6,363 points)

2017 IAAF Race Walking Challenge
 February 19: Oceania Race Walking Championships in  Adelaide
 Winners:  Dane Bird-Smith (m) /  Regan Lamble (f)
 March 12: Circuito Internacional de Marcha #1 in  Ciudad Juárez
 Winners:  Éider Arévalo (m) /  Lupita González (f)
 March 19: Circuito Internacional de Marcha #2 in  Monterrey
 20 km winners:  Benjamin Thorne (m) /  Érica de Sena (f)
 Men's 50 km winner:  Evan Dunfee
 March 19: Asian Race Walking Championships in  Nomi, Ishikawa
 Winners:  Kim Hyun-sub (m) /  Wang Na (f)
 April 1: Grande Prémio Internacional de Rio Maior em Marcha Atlética in  Rio Maior
 Winners:  Éider Arévalo (m) /  Kimberly García (f)
 April 15: IAAF Race Walking Challenge Taicang in  Taicang
 Winners:  Caio Bonfim (m) /  Lü Xiuzhi (f)
 May 13 & 14: Pan American Race Walking Cup in  Lima
 20 km winners:  Éider Arévalo (m) /  Lupita González (f)
 50 km winners:  Claudio Villanueva (m) /  Nair de Rosa (f)
 May 21: European Race Walking Cup in  Poděbrady
 20 km winners:  Christopher Linke (m) /  Antonella Palmisano (f)
 Men's 50 km winner:  Ivan Banzeruk
 June 3: Gran Premio Cantones de La Coruña in  A Coruña
 Winners:  Álvaro Martín (m) /  Érica de Sena (f)
 August 4 – 13: Part of the 2017 World Championships in Athletics (final) in  London
 20 km winners:  Éider Arévalo (m) /  YANG Jiayu (f)
 50 km winners:  Yohann Diniz (m) /  Inês Henriques (f) (World Record)

2017 IAAF Cross Country Permit
 November 13, 2016: Cross de Atapuerca in  Burgos
 Winners:  Aweke Ayalew (m) /  Senbere Teferi (f)
 November 27, 2016: Cross Internacional de la Constitución in  Alcobendas
 Winners:  Timothy Toroitich (m) /  Fionnuala McCormack (f)
 January 6: Campaccio in  San Giorgio su Legnano
 Winners:  Muktar Edris (m) /  Hellen Obiri (f)
 January 14: Antrim International Cross Country in  Antrim
 Winners:  Conseslus Kipruto (m) /  Caroline Chepkoech Kipkirui (f)
 January 15: Cross Internacional de Itálica in  Seville
 Winners:  Aweke Ayalew (m) /  Senbere Teferi (f)
 January 22: Cinque Mulini in  San Vittore Olona
 Winners:  Selemon Barega (m) /  Beyenu Degefa (f)
 February 5: Almond Blossom Cross Country in  Albufeira (final)
 Winners:  Yemanebehran Crippa (m) /  Irene Chepet Cheptai (f)

European Athletic Association (EA)

EA Cross Country Permit
 September 24, 2016: Lidingöloppet in  Lidingö
 Winners:  Japhet Kipchirchir Kipkorir (m) /  Maria Larsson (f)
 October 29, 2016: Nordic Winter Cross in  Middelfart
 Winners:  David Nilsson (m) /  Anna Emilie Møller (f)
 November 20, 2016: Cross de Soria in  Soria
 Winners:  Timothy Toroitich (m) /  Alice Aprot Nawowuna (f)
 November 20, 2016: Darmstadt Cross in  Darmstadt
 Winners:  Daniel Komoi (m) /  Caterina Granz (f)
 November 28, 2016: International Warandecross in  Tilburg
 Winners:  Sondre Nordstad Moen (m) /  Fabienne Schlumpf (f)
 November 28, 2016: Cross de L'Acier in  Leffrinckoucke
 Winners:  Shirtagaseleon Barega (m) /  Beyenu Degefu (f)
 December 18, 2016: Lotto Cross Cup Brussels in  Brussels
 Winners:  Isaac Kimeli (m) /  Fionnuala McCormack (f)
 January 7: Great Edinburgh Cross Country in  Edinburgh
 Winners:  Leonard Essau Korir (m) /  Yasemin Can (f)
 January 8: Cross Zornotza in 
 Winners:  Nguse Amlosom (m) /  Jess Andrews (f)
 January 15: Abdijcross in  Kerkrade
 Winners:  David Nilsson (m) /  Imana Truyers (f)
 January 15: Cross della Vallagarina in  Rovereto
 Winners:  Robert Ndiwa (m) /  Alemitu Hawi (f)
 January 22: Cross Internacional Juan Muguerza in  Elgoibar
 Winners:  Joshua Kiprui Cheptegei (m) /  Senbere Teferi (f)
 January 22: Lotto Cross Cup de Hannut (final) in  Hannut
 Winners:  Andy Vernon (m) /  Birtukan Adamu (f)

EA Premium Permit Meetings
 August 29: Palio Città della Quercia (final) in  Rovereto

EA Classic Permit Meetings
 June 1: Meeting International de Montreuil in 
 100 m winners:  Christophe Lemaitre (m) /  Carole Zahi (f)
 800 m winners:  Mostafa Smaili (m) /  Shelayna Oskan-Clarke (f)
 Men's 1500 m winner:  Ronald Musagala
 Men's 5000 m winner:  Shirtagaseleon Barega
 Men's 110 m Hurdles winner:  Hansle Parchment
 Women's 100 m Hurdles winner:  Isabelle Pedersen
 Women's Pole Vault winner:  Olga Mullina
 Women's Long Jump winner:  Melanie Bauschke
 Women's Discus Throw winner:  Natalia Semenova
 June 2: European Athletics Festival Bydgoszcz in 
 100 m:  Sean McLean (m) /  Barbara Pierre (f)
 400 m winners:  Rafał Omelko (m) /  Justyna Święty (f)
 Women's 600 m winner:  Joanna Jóźwik
 Men's 800 m winner:  Michał Rozmys
 Men's 110 m Hurdles winner:  Damian Czykier
 Women's 100 m Hurdles winner:  Hanna Plotitsyna
 Men's 400 m Hurdles winner:  Abdelmalik Lahoulou
 Women's 1500 m winner:  Martyna Galant
 Men's 3000 m steeplechase winner:  Clement Kimutai Kemboi
 Men's Pole Vault winner:  Paweł Wojciechowski
 Women's High Jump winner:  Yuliya Chumachenko
 Men's Shot Put winner:  Konrad Bukowiecki
 4 × 100 m winners:  B (Karol Kwiatkowski, Przemysław Adamski, Artur Zaczek, Grzegorz Zimniewicz) (m) /  (Marika Popowicz-Drapała, Karolina Zagajewska, Anna Kiełbasińska, Ewa Swoboda) (f)
 June 2: Meeting of Andújar in 
 Men's 100 m winner:  Ramil Guliyev
 200 m winners:  Ramil Guliyev (m) /  Cristina Lara (f)
 800 m winners:  Job Koech Kinyor (m) /  Dorcus Ajok (f)
 Women's 1500 m winner:  Amela Terzić
 Men's 2000 m steeplechase winner:  Benjamin Kigen
 Women's 5000 m winner:  Azmera Gebru
 Men's High Jump winner:  Maksim Nedasekau
 Women's Javelin Throw winner:  Marharyta Dorozhon
 Triple Jump winners:  Pablo Torrijos (m) /  Yulimar Rojas (f)
 Men's Shot Put winner:  Damien Birkinhead
 Men's Discus Throw winner:  Mauricio Ortega
 June 3: Meeting de Marseille in 
 100 m winners:  Jimmy Vicaut (m) /  Blessing Okagbare (f)
 400 m winners:  Pieter Conradie (m) /  Olha Zemlyak (f)
 1500 m winners:  Abdalaati Iguider (m) /  Nelly Jepkosgei (f)
 Men's 3000 m steeplechase winner:  Jairus Birech
 110 m Hurdles winners:  Hansle Parchment (m) /  Pamela Dutkiewicz (f)
 Women's 400 m Hurdles winner:  Joanna Linkiewicz
 Men's Long Jump winner:  Godfrey Khotso Mokoena
 Women's Triple Jump winner:  Kristin Gierisch
 Women's Discus Throw winner:  Mélina Robert-Michon
 June 5: Josef Odložil Memorial in  Prague
 Men's 100 m winner:  Mosito Lehata
 Men's 400 m winner:  Luka Janežič
 Women's 800 m winner:  Olha Lyakhova
 Men's 1500 m winner:  Sadik Mikhou
 Women's 3000 m steeplechase winner:  Norah Jeruto
 Men's 110 m Hurdles winner:  Antonio Alkana
 400 m Hurdles winners:  Mamadou Kassé Hanne (m) /  Wenda Nel (f)
 Women's Long Jump winner:  Neja Filipič
 Men's Pole Vault winner:  Jan Kudlička
 Women's Hammer Throw winner:  Malwina Kopron
 Javelin Throw winners:  Jakub Vadlejch (m) /  Barbora Špotáková (f)
 Men's Shot Put winner:  Tomáš Staněk
 June 14: Janusz Kusociński Memorial in  Szczecin
 Men's 100 m winner:  Dominik Kopeć
 400 m winners:  Rafał Omelko (m) /  Olha Zemlyak (f)
 800 m winners:  Marcin Lewandowski (m) /  Nataliya Pryshchepa (f)
 Women's 1500 m winner:  Sofia Ennaoui
 Men's 3000 m winner:  Bartosz Kotłowski
 Men's 110 m Hurdles winner:  Damian Czykier
 Women's 400 m Hurdles winner:  Kemi Adekoya
 Men's High Jump winner:  Wojciech Theiner
 Pole Vault winners:  Piotr Lisek (m) /  Agnieszka Kaszuba (f)
 Women's Long Jump winner:  Laura Strati
 Men's Shot Put winner:  David Storl
 Men's Discus Throw winner:  Andrius Gudžius
 Hammer Throw winners:  Paweł Fajdek (m) /  Anita Włodarczyk (f)
 Men's Javelin Throw winner:  Hubert Chmielak
 June 14: Meeting Iberoamericano de Atletismo in  Huelva
 400 m winners:  Onkabetse Nkobolo (m) /  Patrycja Wyciszkiewicz (f)
 800 m winners:  Antoine Gakeme (m) /  Dorcus Ajok (f)
 1500 m winners:  Adel Mechaal (m) /  Amela Terzić (f)
 Men's 5000 m winner:  Birhanu Yemataw Balew
 3000 m steeplechase winners:  Yemane Haileselassie (m) /  Fadwa Sidi Madane (f)
 Men's 110 m Hurdles winner:  Orlando Ortega
 Men's 400 m Hurdles winner:  Jordin Andrade
 Women's High Jump winner:  Iryna Herashchenko
 Women's Triple Jump winner:  Elena Panțuroiu
 Men's Hammer Throw winner:  Nick Miller
 Women's Shot Put winner:  Fanny Roos
 Women's 3000 m walk winner:  Laura García-Caro
 June 20: Copenhagen Athletics Games in 
 100 m winners:  Sydney Siame (m) /  Mathilde Kramer (f)
 Men's 400 m winner:  Sadam Koumi
 Men's 800 m winner:  Reinhardt van Rensburg
 Women's 1500 m winner:  Anna Emilie Møller
 Men's 3000 metres steeplechase winner:  Ole Hesselbjerg
 110 m Hurdles winners:  Andreas Martinsen (m) /  Lindsay Lindley (f)
 400 m Hurdles winners:  Jaak-Heinrich Jagor (m) /  Emilia Ankiewicz (f)
 Women's Long Jump winner:  Milena Mitkova
 Men's Pole Vault winner:  Harry Coppell
 Men's Long Jump winner:  
 Women's Shot Put winner:  Paulina Guba
 June 21: European Athletics Classic Meeting in  Velenje
 Men's 100 m winner:  Wayde van Niekerk
 Women's 200 m winner:  Tamzin Thomas
 400 m winners:  Isaac Makwala (m) /  Anita Horvat (f)
 Men's 800 m winner:  Amel Tuka
 Women's 1500 m winner:  Brittany McGowan
 110 m Hurdles winners:  Filip Jakob Demšar (m) /  Rikenette Steenkamp (f)
 Women's High Jump winner:  Maruša Černjul
 Pole Vault winners:  Ernest Obiena (m) /  Tina Šutej (f)
 Long Jump winners:  Maykel Massó (m) /  Kaiza Karlén (f)
 Triple Jump winners:  Dino Subašič (m) /  Petra Koren (f)
 Men's Shot Put winner:  Filip Mihaljević
 Discus Throw winners:  Filip Mihaljević (m) /  Sandra Perković (f)
 Javelin Throw:  Hamish Peacock (m) /  Eda Tuğsuz (f)
 June 28: Meeting Stanislas in  Nancy
 100 m winners::  Henricho Bruintjies (m) /  Floriane Gnafoua (f)
 Women's 400 m winner:  Lydia Jele
 800 m winners:  Willy Tarbei (m) /  Malika Akkaoui (f)
 1500 m:  Abdalaati Iguider
 Men's 110 m Hurdles winner:  Benjamin Sedecias
 Women's 100 m Hurdles winner:  Elvira Herman
 Women's Hammer Throw winner:  Zalina Petrivskaya
 Men's Pole Vault winner:  Kévin Menaldo
 Women's Javelin Throw winner:  Anete Kociņa
 Men's Triple Jump winner:  Hugues Fabrice Zango
 June 29: Sollentuna GP in 
 Men's 100 m winner:  Odain Rose
 200 m winners:  Ahmed Ali (m) /  Krystsina Tsimanouskaya (f)
 800 m winners:  Andreas Kramer (m) /  Christina Hering (f)
 1500 m winners:  Brahim Kaazouzi (m) /  Amela Terzić (f)
 5000 m winners:  Fikadu Haftu (m) /  Emma Mitchell (f)
 3000 m steeplechase winners:  Napoleon Solomon (m) /  Maria Larsson (f)
 Women's 100 m Hurdles winner:  Urszula Bhebhe
 Men's 400 m Hurdles winner:  Cornel Fredericks
 High Jump winners:  Fabian Delryd (m) /  Bianca Salming (f)
 Men's Long Jump winner:  Michel Tornéus
 Women's Triple Jump winner:  Malin Marmbrandt
 Women's Shot Put winner:  Fanny Roos
 Men's Discus Throw winner:  Daniel Ståhl
 Women's Hammer Throw winner:  Eleni Larsson
 Women's U18 3 kg Hammer Throw winner:  Karin Schöldström
 July 4: Gyulai Istvàn Memorial – Hungarian Athletics Grand Prix in  Székesfehérvár
 100 m winners:  Justin Gatlin (m) /  Blessing Okagbare (f)
 Men's 200 m winner:  Isiah Young
 400 m winners:  Steven Gardiner (m) /  Shaunae Miller-Uibo (f)
 Men's 800 m winner:  David Rudisha
 Women's 3000 steeplechase winner:  Etenesh Diro
 Men's 110 m Hurdles winner:  Omar McLeod 
 Women's 100 m Hurdles winner:  Kendra Harrison
 400 m Hurdles winners:  Bershawn Jackson (m) /  Kori Carter (f)
 Men's High Jump winner:  Bohdan Bondarenko 
 Long Jump winners:  Rushwahl Samaai (m) /  Tianna Bartoletta (f)
 Men's Discus Throw winner:  Zoltán Kővágó
 Women's Shot Put winner:  Anita Márton 
 Hammer Throw winners:  Paweł Fajdek (m) /  Anita Włodarczyk (f)
 Men's Javelin Throw winner:  Marcin Krukowski
 July 7: Meeting International de Sotteville in 
 100 m winners:  Yunier Perez (m) /  Carina Horn (f)
 Women's 400 m winner:  Geisa Coutinho
 Women's 800 m winner:  Rose Mary Almanza
 Men's 1500 m winner:  Fouad Elkaam
 Men's 3000 m steeplechase winner:  Mahiedine Mekhissi-Benabbad
 Men's 110 M Hurdles winner:  Andrew Riley
 Men's 400 m Hurdles winner:  Juander Santos
 Men's Long Jump winner:  Zarck Visser
 Women's High Jump winner:  Erika Kinsey
 Women's Pole Vault winner:  Sandi Morris
 Women's Discus Throw winner:  Yaimé Pérez
 June 11: Spitzen Leichtathletik Luzern in 
 100 m winners:  Nickel Ashmeade (m) /  Kelly-Ann Baptiste (f)
 200 m winners:  Nickel Ashmeade (m) /  Léa Sprunger (f)
 400 m winners:  Joel Burgunder (m) /  Morgan Mitchell (f)
 800 m winners:  Amel Tuka (m) /  Christina Hering (f)
 Women's 3000 m steeplechase winner:  Azmera Gebru
 Women's 100 m Hurdles winner:  Sharika Nelvis
 Men's 110 m Hurdles winner:  Devon Allen
 400 m Hurdles winners:  Quincy Downing (m) /  Petra Fontanive (f)
 Hammer Throw winners:  Tristan Schandke (m) /  Nicole Zihlmann (f)
 Long Jump winners:  Paulo Sérgio Oliveira (m) /  Christabel Nettey (f)
 High Jump winners:  Lino Wunderlin (f) /  Doreen Amata (f)
 Javelin Throw winners:  Johannes Vetter (m) /  Christin Hussong (f)
 Women's Pole Vault winner:  Olga Mullina 
 July 11: Gothenburg Athletics Grand Prix in 
 200 m winners:  Richard Kilty (m) /  Vitória Cristina Rosa (f)
 Men's 400 m winner:  Rabah Yousif 
 1000 m winners::  Alexander Nilsson (m) /  Lovisa Lindh (f)
 3000 m steeplechase:  Cornelius Kipruto Kangogo (m) /  Caroline Chepkurui Tuigong (f)
 Women's 100 m Hurdles winner:  Rikenette Steenkamp
 Men's Triple Jump winner:  Cristian Nápoles
 Women's Pole Vault winner:  Katie Nageotte
 Men's Shot Put winner:  Chukwuebuka Enekwechi
 Women's Long Jump winner:  Khaddi Sagnia
 Discus Throw winners:  Martin Wierig (m) /  Gia Lewis-Smallwood (f)
 Women's Javelin Throw winner:  Elisabeth Lithell
 July 16: Meeting Città di Padova in 
 Men's 100 m winner:  Isiah Young
 Women's 200 m winner:  Allyson Felix
 Women's 400 m winner:  Allyson Felix
 800 m winners:  Amel Tuka (m) /  Ajee' Wilson (f)
 1500 m winners:  Jonathan Kiplimo Sawe (m) /  Laura Muir (f)
 Men's 110 m Hurdles winner:  Ronald Levy
 Women's 100 m Hurdles winner:  Queen Harrison
 Men's 400 m Hurdles winner:  Haron Koech
 Men's Long Jump winner:  Juan Miguel Echevarría
 Women's High Jump winner:  Mariya Lasitskene
 Women's Pole Vault winner:  Katerina Stefanidi
 Women's Triple Jump winner:  Dovilė Dzindzaletaitė
 Women's Shot Put winner:  Anita Márton
 July 22: KBC Night of Athletics in  Heusden-Zolder
 Men's 200 m winner:  Cejhae Greene
 Men's 400 m winner:  Machel Cedenio
 800 m winners:  Willy Tarbei (m) /  Renée Eykens (f)
 1500 m winners:  David Torrence (m) /  Colleen Quigley (f)
 5000 m winners:  Birhanu Yemataw Balew (m) /  Susan Krumins (f)
 Men's 110 m Hurdles winner:  Deuce Carter
 Women's 100 m Hurdles winner:  Hanna Plotitsyna
 400 m Hurdles winners:  Omar Cisneros (m) /  Sage Watson (f)
 Women's High Jump winner:  Yuliya Levchenko
 Men's Long Jump winner:  Tiago da Silva
 Women's Pole Vault winner:  Eliza McCartney
 4 × 400 m winners:  (m) /  (f)
 July 26: Karlstad GP in 
 100 m winners:  Ahmed Ali (m) /  Gunta Latiševa-Čudare (f)
 200 m winners:  Ahmed Ali (m) /  Gunta Latiševa-Čudare (f)
 800 m winners:  Willy Tarbei (m) /  Alexa Efraimson (f)
 Men's 3000 m winner:  Benjamin Kovács
 Women's 3000 m steeplechase winner:  Mel Lawrence
 Women's 100 m Hurdles winner:  Jessica Hunter
 Men's 400 m Hurdles winner:  Abderrahmane Samba
 High Jump winners:  Fabian Delryd (m) /  Erika Kinsey (f)
 Women's Pole Vault winner:  Angelica Bengtsson
 Long jump winners:  Michel Tornéus (m) /  Khaddi Sagnia (f)
 Men's Discus Throw winner:  Daniel Ståhl
 Hammer Throw winners:  Oscar Vestlund (m) /  Marinda Petersson (f)
 Men's Javelin Throw winner:  Lars Hamann
 August 18: Malmö Games (final) in

EA Outdoor Special Premium Meetings
 June 1: Athens Street Pole Vault in 
 Winner:  Konstantinos Filippidis (men's only)
 August 15: Kamila Skolimowska Memorial Meeting (final) in  Warsaw
 100 m winners:  Yunier Perez (m) /  Rosângela Santos
 Men's 110 m Hurdles winner:  Devon Allen
 Women's 100 m Hurdles winner:  Sharika Nelvis
 High Jump winners:  Sylwester Bednarek (m) /  Mariya Lasitskene (f)
 Men's Pole Vault winner:  Renaud Lavillenie
 Shot Put winners:  Tomáš Staněk (m) /  Aliona Dubitskaya (f)
 Men's Discus Throw winner:  Robert Harting
 Hammer Throw winners:  Paweł Fajdek (m) /  Anita Włodarczyk (f)

EA Indoor Permit Meeting
 February 3 & 4: Combined Events Meeting in  Lasnamäe
 Men's Heptathlon winner:  Kristjan Rosenberg
 Women's Pentathlon winner:  Margot Meri
 February 4: Reykjavik International Games 2017 in  Reykjavík
  won both the gold and overall medal tallies.
 February 5: All Star Perche in  Clermont Ferrand
 Winners:  Shawnacy Barber (m) /  Sandi Morris (f)
 February 10: Gugl Games in  Linz
 60 m winners:  Eric Cray (m) /  Amelie-Sophie Lederer (f)
 Women's 200 m winner:  Agata Zupin
 Men's 400 m winner:  Luka Janežič
 Women's 800 m winner:  Irene Baldessari
 Men's 1000 m winner:  Daniel Kotyza
 Men's 1500 m winner:  Benjamin Kovács
 60 m Hurdles winners:  Dondre Echols (m) / Ivana Lončarek (f)
 Women's Pole Vault winner:  Tina Šutej
 Men's High Jump winner:  Alen Melon
 Women's Long Jump winner:  Heather Arneton
 Men's Triple Jump winner:  Tomáš Veszelka
 February 11: IFAM Meeting in  Ghent
 60 m winners:  Ryan Shields (m) /  Charlotte Jeanne (f)
 400 m winners:  Alexander Doom (m) /  Agnès Raharolahy (f)
 800 m winners:  Samir Youb (m) /  Joyce Mattagliano (f)
 1500 m winners:  Kalle Berglund (m) /  Darya Barysevich (f)
 Men's 3000 m winner:  Jonas Leandersson
 60 m Hurdles winners:  Vitali Parokhonka (m) /  Sarah Missinne (f)
 High Jump winners:  Lamont Marcell Jacobs (m) /  Hannelore Desmet (f)
 Pole Vault winners:  Huang Bokai (m) /  Angelica Moser (f)
 Long Jump winners:  Abdoulaye Diarra (m) /  Cassandre Evans (f)
 4 × 200 m winners:  (m) /  (f)
 February 14: Czech Indoor Gala in  Ostrava
 60 m winners:  Andrew Fisher (m) /  Gayon Evans (f)
 Men's 300 m winner:  Bralon Taplin
 Women's 400 m winner:  Zuzana Hejnová
 1500 m winners:  Tamás Kazi (m) /  Axumawit Embaye (f)
 Women's 60 m Hurdles winner:  Hanna Plotitsyna
 Men's Pole Vault winner:  Emmanouíl Karális
 Women's High Jump winner:  Michaela Hrubá
 Men's Shot Put winner:  Konrad Bukowiecki
 February 16: Orlen Cup 2017 in  Łódź
 60 m winners:  Yunier Perez (m) /  Ewa Swoboda (f)
 60 m Hurdles winners:  Balázs Baji (m) /  Phylicia George (f)
 Men's Pole Vault winner:  Piotr Lisek
 Men's Shot Put winner:  Konrad Bukowiecki
 Women's High Jump winner:  Kamila Lićwinko
 February 17: Istanbul Athletics Cup in  Istanbul
 60 m winners:  Reza Ghasemi (m) /  Hrystyna Stuy (f)
 400 m winners:  Batuhan Altıntaş (m) /  Olha Zemlyak (f)
 Men's 800 m winner:  Abedin Mujezinovic
 Women's 1500 m winner:  Luiza Gega
 Men's 3000 m winner:  Mekonnen Gebremedhin
 Men's High Jump winner:  Martin Heindl
 Women's Pole Vault winner:  Buse Arikazan
 Men's Long Jump winner:  Daniel Dobrev
 Men's Shot Put winner:  Mesud Pezer
 February 24: Meeting de Atletismo Madrid (final) in  Madrid
 60 m winners:  Yunier Perez (m) /  Andrea Purica (f)
 400 m winners:  Bralon Taplin (m) /  Ayomide Folorunso (f)
 Men's 800 m:  Adam Kszczot
 Women's 1000 m winner:  Genzebe Dibaba
 1500 m winners:  Abderrahmane Anou (m) /  Rababe Arafi (f)
 60 m Hurdles winners:  Orlando Ortega (m) /  Hanna Plotitsyna (f)
 Men's Triple Jump winner:  Alexis Copello
 Women's High Jump winner:  Ruth Beitia
 Women's Pole Vault winner:  Maryna Kylypko
 Long Jump winners:  Eusebio Cáceres (m) /  Juliet Itoya (f)
 Men's Shot Put winner:  Franck Elemba

EA Indoor Area Permit Meetings
 February 4: Meeting Elite en Salle de Mondeville in  Mondeville
 60 m winners:  Kim Collins (m) /  Olesya Povh (f)
 Women's 400 m winner:  Olha Zemlyak
 Men's 1500 m winner:  Abderrahmane Anou
 3000 m winners:  Brahim Kaazouzi /  Taye Fantu (f)
 60 m Hurdles winners:  David King /  Hanna Plotitsyna (f)
 Men's Long Jump winner:  Vladyslav Mazur
 Women's Triple Jump winner:  Iryna Vaskouskaya
 February 10: Vectis Meeting in  Luxembourg–Kirchberg
 60 m winners:  Robert Polkowski (m) /  Ombretta Minkue-Meye (f)
 400 m winners:  Luke Lennon-Ford (m) /  Lara Hoffmann (f)
 800 m winners:  Abdessalem Ayouni (m) /  Kateřina Hálová (f)
 1500 m winners:  Hillary Ngetich /  Claudia Bobocea (f)
 Women's 60 m Hurdles winner:  Sydney Griffin
 High Jump winners:  Tomáš Zeman (m) /  Cathy Zimmer (f)
 Men's Long Jump winner:  Corentin Campener
 Women's Pole Vault winner:  Fanny Smets
 February 10: Meeting féminin du Val d'Oise in  Eaubonne
 Women's 60 m winner:  Flings Owusu-Agyapong
 Women's 400 m winner:  Olha Zemlyak
 Women's 800 m winner:  Olha Lyakhova
 Women's 3000 m winner:  Taye Fantu
 Women's 60 m Hurdles winner:  Hanna Plotitsyna
 Women's High Jump winner:  Yuliya Chumachenko
 Women's Pole Vault winner:  Iryna Yakaltsevich
 Women's Triple Jump winner:  Jeanine Assani Issouf
 February 11: Nordic Indoor Match in  Tampere
 60 m winners:  Eetu Rantala (m) /  Helene Rønningen (f)
 200 m winners:  Samuli Samuelsson (m) /  Helene Rønningen (f)
 400 m winners:  Benjamin Lobo Vedel (m) /  Arna Stefanía Guðmundsdóttir (f)
 Women's 800 m winner:  Stina Troest
 1500 m winners:  William Levay (m) /  Charlotta Fougberg (f)
 3000 m winners:  Samu Mikkonen (m) /  Lena Selen (f)
 60 m Hurdles winners:  Andreas Martinsen (m) /  Susanna Kallur (f)
 High Jump winners:  Fabian Delryd (m) /  Sofie Skoog (f)
 Pole Vault winners:  Eirik Greibrokk Dolve (m) /  Minna Nikkanen (f)
 Long Jump winners:  Roni Ollikainen (m) /  Kaiza Karlén (f)
 Triple Jump winners:  Simo Lipsanen (m) /  Kristiina Mäkelä (f)
 Shot Put winners:  Arttu Kangas (m) /  Fanny Roos (f)
 4 x 300 m winners:  (m) /  (f)
 February 12: Meeting Elite en Salle de Metz in  Metz
 60 m winners:  Yunier Perez (m) /  Marie-Josée Ta Lou (f)
 Women's 400 m winner:  Floria Gueï
 800 m winners:  Paul Renaudie (m) /  Malika Akkaoui (f)
 1500 m winners:  Alexandre Saddedine (m) /  Emilie Jacquot-Claude (f)
 Men's 3000 m winner:  Morhad Amdouni
 60 m Hurdles winners:  Dondre Echols (m) /  Anne Zagré
 Men's Triple Jump winner:  Alexis Copello
 Women's Pole Vault winner:  Maryna Kylypko
 March 4: Indoor Baltic U18 Championships (final) in 
 60 m winners:  Aleksandrs Kucs (m) /  Izabella Bogdanova (f)
 300 m winners:  Aleksandrs Kucs (m) /  Izabella Bogdanova (f)
 800 m winners:  Rojs Puks (m) /  Patricija Cīrule (f)
 3000 m winners:  Armands Štāls (m) / Ilārija Ločmele (f)
 60 m Hurdles winners:  Kristiāns Skuruls (m) /  Marija Elīza Kraule (f)
 4 × 200 m winners:  (Kārlis Eiduks, Raivis Sīlis, Aleksandrs Kucs, Roberts Jānis Zālītis) /  (Reina Rozentāle, Nora Ķigure, Marija Medvedeva, Izabella Bogdanova)
 High Jump winners:  Oļegs Kozjakovs (m) /  Katrīna Zeļģe Luīze (f)
 Long Jump winners:  Artūrs Šarkovičs (m) /  Kitija Paula Melnbārde (f)
 Triple Jump winners:  Artūrs Šarkovičs (m) /  Rūta Lasmane (f)
 Pole Vault winners:  Marks Harčenko (m) /  Sonija Aškinezere (f)
 Shot Put winners:  Vents Andžejs Lūsis (m) /  Aivita Smiļģe (f)

EA Outdoor Area Permit Meetings
 April 1: XXII Medio Maraton Azkoitia-Azpeitia Memorial Diego Garcia in  Azpeitia
 Winners:  Ivan Arrate Lopez (m) /  Marina Aznal (f)
 April 1: XII Milla Internacional de Bilbao in 
 Winners:  Adel Mechaal (m) /  Solange Pereira (f)
 May 1: Georgian Open Championships and Caucasian Cup in  Tbilisi
 May 14: Meeting Elite de Montgeron in  Montgeron
 100 m winners:  Ken Romain (m) /  Carolle Zahi (f)
 250 m winners:  Rafał Omelko (m) /  Jennifer Galais (f)
 800 m winners:  Mohamed Belbachir (m) /  Yuneysi Santiusti (f)
 Women's 100 m Hurdles winner:  Hanna Plotitsyna
 Men's 110 m Hurdles winner:  Garfield Darien
 Men's 3000 m Steplechase winner:  Jakub Holuša
 Men's High Jump winner:  Edgar Rivera
 Men's Triple Jump winner:  Jean-Marc Pontvianne
 Women's Long Jump:  Haoua Kessely
 Women's Discus Throw:  Mélina Robert-Michon
 Men's Javelin throw winner:  Magnus Kirt
 May 25: Riga Cup 2017 in  Riga
 100 m winners:  Chadic Hinds (m) /  Olesya Povh (f)
 200 m winners:  Chadic Hinds (m) /  Yelyzaveta Bryzhina (f)
 Men's 400 m winner:  Jānis Leitis
 Women's 800 m winner:  Martyna Galant
 Men's 400 m Hurdles winner:  Abdelmalik Lahoulou
 Men's 1500 m winner:  Simas Bertašius
 Men's 3000 m Steplechase winner:  Jaouad Chemlal
 Men's Triple Jump winner:  Momchil Karailiev
 Women's Long Jump winner:  Aiga Grabuste 
 High Jump winners:  Viktor Lonskyi (m) /  Urszula Gardzielewska (f)
 Javelin throw winners:  Edis Matusevičius (m) /  Eda Tuğsuz (f)
 Men's Shot Put winner:  Mesud Pezer
 May 28: Meeting Elite de Forbach in 
 100 m winners:  Diondre Batson (m) /  Alexandria Anderson (f)
 400 m winners:  Rafał Omelko (m) /  Justyna Święty (f)
 Men's 800 m winner:  Abdelatif Elguesse
 Men's 100 m Hurdles winner:  Benjamin Sedecias
 Women's 100 m Hurdles winner:  Karolina Kołeczek
 Men's Pole Vault winner:  Kévin Menaldo
 Triple Jump winners:  Adil Gandou (m) /  Anna Jagaciak-Michalska (f)
 Hammer Throw:  Quentin Bigot (m) /  Anita Włodarczyk (f)
 June 10 & 11: Nordic Junior Championships in Combined Events and Compined Events Match in 
 Men's Decathlon winner:  Elmo Savola
 Women's Heptathlon winner:  Bianca Salming
 Men's U23 Decathlon winner:  Tuomas Valle
 Women's U23 Heptathlon winner:  Miia Sillman
 Men's U20 Decathlon winner:  Leo Uusimäki
 Women's U20 Heptathlon winner:  Amanda Grefstad Frøynes
 Men's U18 Decathlon winner:  Mads Lund
 Women's U18 Heptathlon winner:  Erika Wärff
 June 11: Folksam Challenge 1 in 
 400 m winners:  Felix Francois (m) /  Lisa Duffy (f)
 Men's 800 m winner:  Jake Wightman
 Women's 1500 m winner:  Katie Snowden
 Men's 3000 m Steplechase winner:  Stewart McSweyn
 Women's 100 m Hurdles winner:  Mari Klaup
 Men's Pole Vault winner:  Carl Sténson 
 Triple Jump winners:  Erik Ehrlin (m) /  Janne Nielsen (f)
 Women's Long Jump winner:  Nadia Akpana Assa
 Men's Discus Throw winner:  Simon Pettersson
 June 16: International Match in 
 Winners:  (431 points), 2nd place:  (371.5 points), 3rd place:  (297 points), 4th place:  (193.5 points)
 June 18: Janis Lusis Cup in  Jelgava
 Javelin Throw winners:  Ansis Brūns (m) /  Madara Palameika (f)
 U20 Javelin Throw winners:  Matīss Velps (m) /  Aiva Niedra (f)
 U18 Javelin Throw winners:  Krišjānis Suntažs (m) /  Meda Majauskaite (f)
 June 24: XVI Reunion Internacional de Atletismo "Villa De Bilbao" in  Bilbao
 100 m winners:  Thando Roto (m) /  Rachel Miller (f)
 Men's 200 m winner:  Clarence Munyai
 Men's 400 m winner:  Yoandys Lescay
 800 m winners:  Elliot Giles (m) /  Rose Mary Almanza (f)
 Men's 1500 m winner:  İlham Tanui Özbilen
 3000 m winners:  Hamid Ben Daoud (m) /  Ana Dulce Félix (f)
 Men's 3000 m Steplechase winner:  Albert Chemutai
 Long Jump winners:  Maykel Massó (m) /  Yorgelis Rodríguez (f)
 Men's Pole Vault winner:  Gonzalo Santamaría
 Men's Disc Throw (2 kg) winner:  Alejandro Vielva Alvarez
 Women's Disc Throw winner:  Yaime Pérez
 Men's Triple Jump winner:  Andy Díaz
 Women's Javelin Throw winner:  Zahra Bani
 Men's Shot Put winner:  Joaquin Millan Diaz
 July 12: Meeting Int. di Atletica Leggera Sport Solidarieta in  Lignano Sabbiadoro
 100 m winners:  Isiah Young (m) /  English Gardner (f)
 400 m winners:  Josephus Lyles (m) /  Phyllis Francis (f)
 800 m winners:  Jamal Hairane (m) /  Lauren Johnson (f)
 1500 m winners:  Jonathan Kiplimo Sawe (m) /  Selah Jepleting Busienei (f)
 Women's 100 m Hurdles winner:  Dawn Harper-Nelson
 Men's 400 m Hurdles winner:  Haron Koech
 Men's High Jump winner:  Bryan McBride
 Women's Long Jump winner:  Brooke Stratton
 Men's Discus Throw winner:  Rodney Brown
 July 12: Joensuu Games in  Joensuu
 100 m winners:  Emile Erasmus (m) /  Alexandra Bezeková (f)
 Men's 200 m winner:  Hendrik Maartens
 800 m winners:  Takuma Murashima (m) /  Shannon Osika (f)
 Men's 5000 m winner:  Chakib Lachgar
 Women's 3000 m winner:  Kasumi Nishihara
 Men's 110 m Hurdles winner:  Vitali Parakhonka
 Women's 100 m Hurdles winner:  Lindsay Lindley
 Men's Discus Throw winner:  Martin Kupper
 Women's Long Jump winner:  Aiga Grabuste
 Javelin Throw winners:  Jakub Vadlejch (m) /  Ásdís Hjálmsdóttir (f)
 Women's High Jump winner:  Kateryna Tabashnyk
 Women's Triple Jump winner:  Neele Eckhardt
 Men's Hammer Throw winner:  Yuri Shayunoi
 July 12: Morton Games in  Dublin
 Men's 100 m winner:  Jeff Demps
 Women's 200 m winner:  Margaret Adeoye
 Men's 400 m winner:  Brian Gregan
 800 m winners:  Kyle Langford (m) /  Alexa Efraimson (f)
 1500 m winners:  Jack Hallas (m) /  Alexa Efraimson (f)
 Men's 5000 m winner:  Stewart McSweyn
 Men's 1 Mile winner:  Robert Domanic
 Men's 400 m Hurdles winner:  Alfredo Sepúlveda
 Men's Pole Vault winner:  Mareks Ārents
 Women's Discus Throw winner:  Jade Lally
 July 15: Baltic U16 Championships in 

 Teams score: 1st place:  (209 p.), 2nd place:  (194 p.), 3rd place:  (156 p.)
 July 16: Savo Games in  Lapinlahti
 Men's 100 m winner:  Emile Erasmus
 200 m winners:  Sydney Siame (m) /  Alexandra Bezeková (f)
 1500 m winners:  Chakib Lachgar (m) /  Shannon Osika (f)
 Men's 3000 m winner:  Kazuma Taira
 Women's 3000 m Steplechase winner:  Marisa Howard
 Men's 110 m Hurdles winner:  Elmo Lakka
 Women's 100 m Hurdles winner:  Lindsay Lindley
 Men's 400 m Hurdles winner:  Jaak-Heinrich Jagor
 Men's Shot Put winner:  Mikhail Abramchuk
 Men's Long Jump winner:  Kristian Pulli
 Men's Javelin Throw winner:  Keshorn Walcott
 Women's Discus Throw winner:  Katri Hirvonen
 Women's Hammer Throw winner:  Johanna Salmela
 Women's High Jump winner:  Kateryna Tabashnyk
 July 18: 66th Cork City Sports in  Cork
 100 m winners:  Sean McLean (m) /  Barbara Pierre (f)
 200 m winners:  Sean McLean (m) /  Crystal Emmanuel (f)
 800 m winners:  Antonio Mascoll (m) /  Laura Roesler (f)
 Men's 1 mile winner:  Sam Prakel
 3000 m winners:  Reid Buchanan (m) /  Sheila Reid
 Men's 400 m Hurdles:  Javier Culson
 High Jump winners:  Chris Baker (m) /  Emma Nuttall (f)
 Men's Long Jump winner:  Allan Hamilton
 Women's Hammer Throw winner:  Ida Storm
 Men's Shot Put winner:  Chukwuebuka Enekwechi
 July 28 & 29: President Cup/ Baltic Team championship in 
  win overall gold and medal tabel.
 August 5: Folksam Challenge 2 in 
 Men's 100 m winner:  Alexander Brorsson (m)
 Men's 300 m winner:  Luguelín Santos (m)
 Men's 400 m winner:  Brian Murphy
 Men's 800 m winner:  Gideon Kipngetich
 Men's 5000 m winner:  Ababa Lama
 Men's 110 m Hurdles winner:  Alexander Brorsson
 Men's High Jump winner:  Fabian Delryd
 Men's Long Jump winner:  Darius Aučyna
 Men's Shot Put winner:  Daniel Ståhl
 Men's Hammer Throw winner:  Mattias Jons
 August 16: Grand Prix of Sopot – Memorial of Janusz Sidlo in  Sopot
 August 19: Folksam Challenge 3 in 
 August 19 & 20: Nordic Match U20 in 
 September 3: 7th Kamila Skolimowska Memorial in 
 September 30: XXX Milla Internacional de Berango in 
 November 27: Maratón Donostia-San Sebastián (final) in

EA Road Area Permit Races
 January 29: Cross de San Sebastián in 
 Winners:  Sadik Mikhou /  Bontu Edao Rebitu (f)  
 February 19: Maratón Ciudad de Sevilla in 
 Winners:  Titus Ekiru (m) /  Paula González Berodia (f)
 April 1: XXII Medio Maraton Azkoitia-Azpeitia Memorial Diego Garcia in  Azpeitia
 Winners:  Ivan Arrate Lopez (m) /  Marina Aznal (f)
 April 1: XII Milla Internacional de Bilbao in 
 Winners:  Adel Mechaal (m) /  Solange Pereira (f)
 April 23: Madrid Marathon in 
 Winners:  Bonsa Dida (m) /  Elizabeth Rumokol (f)
 April 30: XXII Medio Maraton de Albacete in 
 Winners:  Ivan Fernandez Anaya (m) /  Pamela Cherotick (f)
 10 km winners:  Jaouad Oumellal (m) /  Candi García Tejero (f)
 September 30: XXX Milla Internacional de Berango (final) in

EA Race Walking Permit Meeting
 March 25: Dudinská Päťdesiatka in  Dudince
 Winners:  Håvard Haukenes (m) /  Agnieszka Ellward (f)
 April 8: Podebrady Walking 2017 in 
 U20 10 km walk winners:  Vojtěch Libnar (m) /  Daphne Dimanopulosz (f)
 Men's U18 10 km walk winner:  Bálint Sárossi
 Women's U18 5 km walk winner:  Austėja Kavaliauskaitė
 20 km walk winners:  Genadij Kozlovskij (m) /  Živilė Vaiciukevičiūtė (f)
 Men's 35 km walk winner:  Bence Venyercsán
 50 km walk winners:  Håvard Haukenes (m) / /  Agnieszka Ellward (f)
 June 9: 43rd International Race Walking Festival in  Alytus (final)
 1 km winners:  Arnoldas Petryla (m) /  Sonata Urbonavičiūtė (f)
 3 km winners:  Raivo Liniņš (m) /  Toma Dailidonyte (f)
 5 km winners:  Normunds Ivzāns (m) /  Austėja Kavaliauskaitė (m)
 10 km winners:  Stanislav Kuzmich (m) /  Athanasía Vaitsi (f)
 20 km winners:  Dawid Tomala (m) /  Brigita Virbalytė-Dimšienė (f0

EA Combined Events Area Permit Meeting
 June 3 – 4: VII Meeting Internacional de Arona in 
 Decathlon winner:  Taavi Tšernjavski
 Junior Decathlon winner:  Leon Okafor
 Youth Decathlon winner:  Jorge Davila
 Heptatlon winner:  Marisa Vaz Carvalho (5.755 p.)
 Youth Heptatlon winner:  Maria Vicente (5.522 p.)

EA Race Walking Area Permit Meetings
 August 19 & 20: Nordic RW Match in

Continental events

February 5: European Champion Clubs Cup Cross Country in  Albufeira
 Men's Club winner:  Gruppo Sportivo Fiamme Oro (Yemaneberhan Crippa, Paolo Zanatta, Pietro Riva, François Marzetta, Simone Gariboldi)
 Women's Club winner:  Üsküdar Belediyespor (Irene Chepet Cheptai, Esma Aydemir, Özlem Kaya, Alemitu Bekele Degfa, Aslı Çakır Alptekin, Elif Karabulut, Emine Hatun Tuna)
 February 12: Balkan Junior Indoor Championships in  Istanbul

  won the gold medal tally.  won the overall medal tally.
 February 12: Central American Race Walking Championships in  Guatemala City
 U14 winners:  Shavi Daniel Guerra García (m) /  Yaquelin Mishell Teletor Jerónimo (f)
 U16 winners:  Luis Luciano Tzunun Cabrera (m) /  Glendy Verónica Teletor Jerónimo (f)
 U18 winners:  José Eduardo Ortíz Flores (m) /  Melany Nicolle Elías Trejo (f)
 U20 winners:  Anibal Xiquin Zapeta (m) /  Yasuri Palacios San José (f)
 Winners:  José Alejandro Barrondo (m) /  Mayra Herrera (f)
 February 19: South American Cross Country Championships in  Santiago
 Winners:  René Champi (m) /  Carmen Toaquiza (f)
 Juniors winners:  Daniel Ferreira do Nascimento (m) /  Rina Cjuro (f)
 Youth winners:  Patricio Pinto Quinchahual (m) /  Laura Acuña Vidal (f)
 Mixed relay winners: 
 February 19: Oceania Race Walking Championships in  Adelaide
 Winners:  Dane Bird-Smith (m) /  Regan Lamble (f)
 February 25: Balkan Athletics Indoor Championships in  Belgrade

  and  won the gold medal tally. Greece won the overall medal tally.
 February 26: Central American Cross Country Championships in 
 Winners:  Williams Alexander Sánchez (m) /  Mónica Vargas (f)
 U20 winners:  Erick Saúl Hernández Salguero (m) /  Mirta Hércules (f)
 U18 winners:  Damian Raimundo Garcia Isaacs (m) /  Sara Martina Hernández Moran (f)
 U16 winners:  Andy Felipe Cordoba (m) /  Daniela Alexandra Aragón Valencia (f)
 U14 winners:  Alejandro José Plata Sequeira (m) /  Jenifer Beatriz Salas Acosta (f)
 Mixt relay 4 x 1000 m winners:  A (Erick Saúl Hernández Salguero, Brenda Alejandrina Salmerón Menjivar, Mirta Hércules, David Alexander Escobar Castillo)
 Youth Mixt Relay 4 x 500 m winners:  (Alexandra Barrios Jiménez, Andy Felipe Cordoba, Damian Raimundo Garcia Isaacs, Mariana Alexandra Muñoz Alvarado)
 March 3 – 5: 2017 European Athletics Indoor Championships in  Belgrade

  won the gold medal tally and the overall medal tally.
 March 4: NACAC Cross Country Championships in  Boca Raton
 Winners:  Abbabiya Simbassa (m) /  Sasha Gollish (f)
 Juniors winners:  Kiernan Lumb (m) /  Brogan MacDougall (f)
 Team winners:  (m) /  (f)
 Juniors Team winners:  (m) /  (f)
 March 11 & 12: 2017 European Throwing Cup in  Las Palmas
 Discus Throw winners:  Lukas Weisshaidinger (m) /  Mélina Robert-Michon (f)
 U23 Discus Throw winners:  Alin Alexandru Firfirică (m) /  Claudine Vita (f)
 Javelin Throw winners:  Julian Weber (m) /  Martina Ratej (f)
 U23 Javelin Throw winners:  Adrian Mardari (m) /  Sara Kolak (f)
 Hammer Throw winners:  Quentin Bigot (m) /  Alexandra Tavernier (f)
 U23 Hammer Throw winners:  Alexej Mikhailov (m) /  Marinda Petersson (f)
 Shot Put winners:  Mesud Pezer (m) /  Anita Márton (f)
 U23 Shot Put winners:  Osman Can Özdeveci (m) /  Fanny Roos (f)
 March 18: South American Half Marathon Championships in 
 Winners:  Damião Ancelmo de Souza (m) /  Clara Cachanya (f)
 March 19: Asian Race Walking Championships in  Nomi
 Winners:  Kim Hyun-sub (m) /  Wang Na (f)
 March 19: South American Marathon Championships in  Temuco
 Winners:  Enzo Yáñez (m) /  Mirela Saturnino de Andrade (f)
 April 8: Balkan Race Walking Championships in  Florina
 20 km winners:  Alexandros Papamichail (m) /  Antigoni Drisbioti (f)
 U20 10 km winners:  Abdülselam İmuk (m) /  Sofia Alikanioti (f)
 Men's U18 10 km winner:  Umut Temel
 Women's U18 5 km winner:  Kader Dost
 May 6 & 7: South American Junior Championships in Athletics in  Leonora
 Points winners: 1st. , 2nd. , 3rd. 
 Medal winners: 1st. , 2nd. , 3rd. 
 May 14: Balkan Half Marathon Championships in  Pristina
 Winners:  Serkan Kaya (m) /  Şeyma Yıldız (f)
 Teams winners:  (m) /  (f)
 May 20 – 23: 2017 Asian Youth Athletics Championships in  Bangkok
  won the gold medal tally and the overall medal tally.
 May 21: European Race Walking Cup in  Poděbrady
 Women's 10 km winner:  Yana Smerdova
 Men's 20 km winner:  Christopher Linke (m) /  Antonella Palmisano (f)
 Men's 50 km winner:  Ivan Banzeruk
 Men's U20 10 km winner:  Leo Köpp 
 May 26 – 28: 2017 Central American Junior and Youth Championships in Athletics in  Managua
 May 27 & 28: European Champion Clubs Cup–Group B in  Leiria
 Winners:  Atletica Riccardi (m) /  ASD Bracco Atletica (f)
 June 3: Balkan Youth Championships in  Istanbul
  won the gold medal tally and the overall medal tally.
 June 10: European Cup 10,000m in  Minsk
 Winners:  Antonio Abadía (m) /  Sara Moreira
 Teams winners:  (m) /  (f)
 June 10: Balkan Mountain Running Championships in  Teteven
 Seniors winners:  Cătălin Atănăsoaie (m) /  Denisa Dragomir (f)
 U20 winners:  Orhan Öztürk (m) /  Atalay Bahar (f)
 June 23 – 25: 2017 Central American Championships in Athletics in  Tegucigalpa
 June 24 & 25: 2017 European Team Championships Super League in  Lille
 Teams winner:  (321.5 points)
 Relegated to 1st League: ,  and 

 June 23 – 25: European Athletics Team Championships, 1st League in  Vaasa
 Teams winner:  (321.5 points)

 June 24 & 25: European Athletics Team Championships, 2 League in  Tel Aviv
 Teams winner:  (372.5 points)

 June 24 & 25: European Athletics Team Championships, 3 League in  Marsa
 Teams winner:  (317 points)

 June 28 – 30: 2017 Oceania Athletics Championships in  Suva
 U18:  won the gold medal tally and the overall medal tally.
 U20:  won the gold medal tally and the overall medal tally.
 Seniors:  won the gold medal tally. Papua New Guineea and  won the overall medal tally.
 June 29 – July 2: 2017 African Junior Athletics Championships in  Tlemcen
  won the gold medal tally and the overall medal tally.
 July 1 & 2: European Combined Events Team Championships in  Tallinn
 Winners: 
 Decathlon winners: 1st:  Janek Õiglane, 2nd:  Oleksiy Kasyanov, 3rd:  Karl Robert Saluri
 Heptathlon winners: 1st:  Alina Shukh, 2nd:  Géraldine Ruckstuhl, 3rd:  Grit Šadeiko
 July 1 & 2: European Combined Events Team Championships 1 & 2 Leagues in  Monzón
 1st League Winners: 
 Decathlon winners: 1st:  Jorge Ureña, 2nd:  Marcus Nilsson, 3rd:  Bas Markies
 Heptathlon winners: 1st:  Nadine Broersen, 2nd:  Eliška Klučinová, 3rd:  Lecabela Quaresma
 2nd League winners: 
 Decathlon winners: 1st:  Martin Roe, 2nd:  Lars Vikan Rise, 3rd:  Edgars Eriņš
 Heptathlon winners: 1st:  Lucia Slaničková, 2nd:  Austra Skujytė, 3rd:  Kate O'Connor
 July 1 & 2: Balkan Junior Championships in  Craiova
  won the gold medal tally and the overall medal tally.
 July 2: Oceania Marathon and Half Marathon Championships in  Gold Coast
 Marathon winners:  Dave Ridley (m) /  Virginia Moloney (f)
 Half Marathon winners:  Timothy Lefroy (m) /  Eloise Wellings (f)
 July 6 – 9: 2017 Asian Athletics Championships in  Bhubaneswar
  won the gold medal tally and the overall medal tally.
 July 8: European Mountain Running Championships in  Kamnik
 Seniors:  Xavier Chevrier (m) /  Maude Mathys (f)
 U20:  Gabriel Bularda (m) /  Lisa Oed (f)
 July 13 – 16: 2017 European Athletics U23 Championships in  Bydgoszcz
 100 m winners:  Ojie Edoburun (m) /  Ewa Swoboda (f)
 200 m winners:  Ján Volko (m) /  Finette Agyapong (f)
 400 m winners:  Luka Janežič (m) /  Gunta Latiševa-Čudare (f)
 800 m winners:  Andreas Kramer (m) /  Renée Eykens (f)
 1500 m winners:  Marius Probst (m) /  Konstanze Klosterhalfen (f)
 5000 m winners:  Yemaneberhan Crippa (m) /  Yasemin Can (f)
 10000 m winners:  Carlos Mayo (m) /  Yasemin Can (f)
 Men's 3000 m steeplechase winners:  Yohanes Chiappinelli
 Men's 110 m Hurdles winner:  Ludovic Payen
 Women's 100 m Hurdles winner:  Nadine Visser
 400 m Hurdles winners:  Karsten Warholm (m) /  Ayomide Folorunso (f)
 High Jump winners:  Dzmitry Nabokau (m) /  Yuliya Levchenko (f)
 Pole Vault winners:  Ben Broeders (m) /  Angelica Moser (f)
 Long Jump winners:  Vladyslav Mazur (m) /  Yanis David (f)
 Triple Jump winners:  Nazim Babayev (m) /  Elena Panțuroiu (f)
 Shot Put winners:  Konrad Bukowiecki (m) /  Fanny Roos (f)
 Discus Throw winners:  Sven Martin Skagestad (m) /  Claudine Vita (f)
 Hammer Throw winners:  Bence Halász (m) /  Alyona Shamotina (f)
 Javelin Throw winners:  Norbert Rivasz-Tóth (m) /  Sara Kolak (f)
 Men's Decathlon winner:  Jiří Sýkora (8084 p.)
 Women's Heptathlon winner:  Caroline Agnou (f) (6330 p.)
 Women's 4 × 100 m winners: 
 4 × 400 m winners:  (m) /  (f)
 20 km walk winners:  Diego García (m) /  Klavdiya Afanasyeva (f)
 July 15 & 16: Balkan Athletics Championships in  Novi Pazar
 100 m winners:  Jak Ali Harvey (m) /  Katerina Dalaka (f)
 200 m winners:  Jak Ali Harvey (m) /  Emmanouella Keramida (f)
 400 m winners:  Mateo Ružić (m) /  Bianca Răzor (f)
 800 m winners:  Abedin Mujezinović (m) /  Amela Terzić (f)
 400 m Hurdles winners:  Yan Eloi Senjarić (m) /  Elif Yıldırım (f)
 1500 m winners:  Mitko Tsenov (m) /  Amela Terzić (f)
 3000 m winners:  David Nikolli (m) /  Adela Bălțoi (f)
 3000 m steeplechase winners:  Osman Junuzović (m) /  Adela Bălțoi (f)
 5000 m winners:  Yolo Nikolov (m) /  Cristina Negru (f)
 Men's 110 m Hurdles winner:  Cosmin Ilie Dumitrache
 Women's 100 m Hurdles winner:  Elisavet Pesiridou
 Pole Vault winners:  Ivan Horvat (m) /  Maria Aristotelous (f)
 High Jump winners:  Konstadinos Baniotis (m) /  Tatiana Gousin (f)
 Long Jump winners:  Lazar Anić (m) /  Chaido Alexouli (f)
 Triple Jump winners:  Momchil Karailiev (m) /  Carmen Toma (f)
 Hammer Throw winners:  Özkan Baltacı (m) /  Zalina Petrivskaya (f)
 Discus Throw winners:  Martin Marić (m) /  Dragana Tomašević (f)
 Javelin Throw winners:  Branko Pauković (m) /  Marija Vučenović (f)
 Shot Put winners:  Mesud Pezer (m) /  Dimitriana Surdu (f)
 Men's Decathlon winner:  Aleksandar Grnović (7.225 p.)
 Women's Heptathlon winner:  Mladena Petrušić (4.796 p.)
 4 × 100 m winners:  (Marius Florin Şerban, Alexandru Terpezan, Ionuţ Andrei Neagoe, Daniel Mihai Budin) /  (Ivana Petković, Katarina Sirmić, Tamara Vuletić, Milana Tirnanić) (f) 
 4 × 400 m winners:  (Stjepan Bojanić, Igor Garaj, Ivan Marković, Stefan Vukadinović) (m) /  (Camelia Florina Gal, Anamaria Ioniță, Roxana Maria Ene, Bianca Răzor) (f) 
 July 20 – 23: 2017 European Athletics U20 Championships in  Grosseto
  and  won the gold medal tally. Great Britain won the overall medal tally.
 October 8: Balkan Marathon Championships in  Zagreb
 November 11: Balkan Cross Country Championships in  Çanakkale
 November 17: South American Mountain Running Championships in  Villa La Angostura
 November 24 – 26: U14 & U16 Central American Championships in Athletics in  San José
 December 10: European Cross Country Championships in  Šamorín

Deaths

References

Notes

External links

 IAAF Official Website

 
Athletics
2017